David Joel Friedman (born Washington, D. C.) is an American poet.

Life
He was raised in Washington, D.C., and studied at Cornell University, and Columbia University.

He lives in New York City.

Awards
 2004 National Poetry Series, for The Welcome

Works
 "Welcome", Poetry Daily

Reviews
Fact is, though, writers like Friedman show that some people are actually willing to plant something in the ground that has been broken by prose poets like Maxine Chernoff, Charles Simic and James Tate. Not to say that The Welcome is derivative – rather that it is aware of what has gone before it, that it is the continuation of a noble tradition of smart, witty, accessible yet intelligent prose poetry. In a literary climate where most poets just want credit for breaking new ground, no matter how many times it's been broken already, this would be enough in itself.

References

1938 births
Living people
American male poets
Poets from Washington, D.C.